Route 1 is a  long provincial highway that serves as the Prince Edward Island section of the Trans-Canada Highway. Route 1 traverses the southern shores of Prince Edward Island, from the Confederation Bridge in Borden-Carleton to the Wood Islands ferry dock, and bypasses the provincial capital, Charlottetown.

Route description 

Route 1 serves several towns and communities along the southern shore of Prince Edward Island, as well as bypassing the provincial capital, Charlottetown. The route begins at the northern end of the Confederation Bridge, which crosses the Northumberland Strait to New Brunswick, where the highway becomes New Brunswick Route 16. Travelling eastward, a spur route, Route 1A, branches north towards Summerside. The highway continues meandering east through the communities of Crapaud and Bonshaw, and bypasses Clyde River and Cornwall before crossing the waterway dividing the North River and Graham Rogers Lake into Charlottetown.

Within Charlottetown, Route 1 jogs north along Upton Road then east onto the Charlottetown Perimeter Highway and wraps around the city centre before turning and crossing the Hillsborough River on the Hillsborough River Bridge into Stratford. From there the route travels south near the shore of the Northumberland Strait to Wood Islands. Vehicles can continue via the Northumberland Ferries Limited ferry to Nova Scotia Highway 106 at Caribou, Nova Scotia.

Route 1 features the only grade-separated interchanges in the province: a trumpet interchange with the spur Route 1A in Albany, and double roundabout diamond interchanges at Route 27 in New Haven and Route 19 in Cornwall.

History 

On May 17, 2010, construction began on upgrades to the Charlottetown Perimeter Highway.
This work was completed later that year on October 15.
Route 1 was then transferred from its old routing along University Avenue and Grafton Street onto the new highway.

A proposal to realign Route 1 through Strathgartney Provincial Park west of Charlottetown was met with significant public opposition in 2011. Construction started on a revised route avoiding the park, dubbed Plan B by opponents, in October 2012. Environmentalists protesting at the work site caused construction to be halted for several days. Darcie Lanthier, then interim leader of the P.E.I. Green Party, was arrested and several protesters charged with trespassing before construction resumed. The realignment opened to traffic on September 23, 2013. The protest group, which became known as Stop Plan B, monitored construction throughout the project and returned in October 2015 to plant trees along the new alignment.

On September 6, 2016, construction began on the Cornwall Perimeter Highway, a new alignment bypassing the town of Cornwall to the north. Construction was mostly complete and the new bypass opened to traffic on October 1, 2019. Upon its opening, the former alignment was renumbered Route 27. The town plans to develop the former arterial highway into a commercial thoroughfare and community hub.

Major intersections

References

001
Prince Edward Island 001
Transport in Charlottetown
001
001